The 2004 National League Championship Series (NLCS) was a Major League Baseball playoff series played from October 13 to 21 to determine the champion of the National League, between the Central Division champion St. Louis Cardinals and the wild-card qualifying Houston Astros. This marked the first time in either Major League that two teams from the Central Division met in a Championship Series.

In a series in which all seven games were won by the home team, the Cardinals won 4–3 to advance to the World Series against the American League champion Boston Red Sox. The Red Sox reached their first World Series since 1986, with the Cardinals playing in their first since 1987. While the NLCS was an exciting back-and-forth series, it was overshadowed in media attention by Boston's 3-0 comeback in the ALCS.

The Cardinals would go on to lose in a sweep to the Boston Red Sox in the World Series in four games.

Summary

St. Louis Cardinals vs. Houston Astros

Game summaries

Game 1
Wednesday, October 13, 2004 at Busch Stadium (II) in St. Louis, Missouri

The series opener at St. Louis' Busch Stadium was a slugfest involving five home runs, 17 runs, and 22 hits, eventually won by St. Louis, 10–7. Houston struck the first blow of the series when Carlos Beltrán hit a two-run home run in the top of the first inning after a leadoff single off Woody Williams. The Cardinals answered with a home run by Albert Pujols in the bottom half after a one-out triple off Brandon Backe, tying the game at two. Houston took a 4–2 lead in the fourth inning on a two-run home run by Jeff Kent, but the Cards tied it again in the fifth on Larry Walker's RBI double off Backe and Scott Rolen's RBI single off Chad Qualls. In the sixth, Edgar Renteria and Reggie Sanders hit back-to-back leadoff singles before a sacrifice bunt moved them up one base. Pinch hitter Roger Cedeno's groundout scored Renteria to put the Cardinals up 5-4 for the first time in this game. Tony Womack followed with an RBI single, then stole second before scoring on Walker's single aided by shortstop Jose Vizcaino's error. After Qualls walked Pujols, Chad Harville in relief walked Rolen to load the bases before Jim Edmonds cleared them with a double to put the Cardinals up 10–4. The Astros cut it to 10−6 with a two-run home run from Lance Berkman in the eighth off Ray King. Next inning, a two-out solo home run from Mike Lamb off Julián Tavárez made it 10−7. Craig Biggio then hit a ground-rule double before Jason Isringhausen relieved Julián Tavárez and got Beltran to ground out to first on the first pitch to end the game.  All seven of the Astros' runs in Game 1 were scored on home runs.

Game 2
Thursday, October 14, 2004 at Busch Stadium (II) in St. Louis, Missouri

The Astros scored three runs off Cardinals' Matt Morris on home runs by Carlos Beltran in the first and Morgan Ensberg in the fourth. Lance Berkman added an RBI single in the fifth with two on, but in the bottom of the inning, two-run home runs from Larry Walker off starter Peter Munro and Scott Rolen off reliever Chad Harville put the Cardinals up 4−3. The Astros tied it in the seventh off Kiko Calero when Berkman hit a leadoff double, stole third and scored on Ensberg's single, but the Cardinals retook the lead in the bottom of the eighth inning with back-to-back home runs from Albert Pujols and Scott Rolen off Dan Miceli. Jason Isringhausen pitched a scoreless ninth despite allowing two walks as the Cardinals' 6−4 win put them up 2−0 in the series heading to Houston.

Game 3
Saturday, October 16, 2004 at Minute Maid Park in Houston, Texas

In the first game of the series played in Houston's Minute Maid Park, the Cardinals went up 1−0 in the first on Larry Walker's one-out home run, but the Astros tied it in the bottom of the inning off Jeff Suppan on Lance Berkman's RBI single before Jeff Kent's two-run home run put them up 3−1. Jim Edmonds' leadoff home run in the second cut it to 3−2, but the Astros added two insurance runs in the eighth on home runs from Carlos Beltran off Dan Haren and Berkman off Ray King. Roger Clemens pitched seven innings for the 5−2 win, which left the Astros trailing 2–1 in the series.

Game 4
Sunday, October 17, 2004 at Minute Maid Park in Houston, Texas

The Cardinals struck first in Game 3 when Roy Oswalt walked Larry Walker with one out before Albert Pujols hit a two-run home run. Scott Rolen then doubled, moved to third on a groundout, and after a walk, scored on John Mabry's single to put the Cardinals up 3−0. The Astros cut it to 3−1 in the bottom of the inning when Carlos Beltran walked with one out off Jeff Bagwell's double off Jason Marquis. In the top of the third, Pujols drew a leadoff walk, moved to third on Rolen's single and scored on Jim Edmonds' sacrifice fly, but the Astros cut the lead to 4−3 when Beltran and Bagwell singled with one out and scored on Lance Berkman's double. Pujols's single with two on in the fourth put the Cardinals up 5−3, but the Astros cut the lead back to one on Berkman's leadoff home run in the sixth off Kiko Calero. Jose Vizcaino doubled two outs later and scored on Raul Chavez's single to tie the game. Next inning, Beltran's home run off Julián Tavárez put the Astros up 6−5. Brad Lidge pitched two shutout innings for the save as the Astros evened the series with the Cardinals at two games apiece. Beltrán tied records for the most home runs in a single postseason (8) and most consecutive postseason games with a home run (5). The latter record would be broken by Daniel Murphy in Game Four of the 2015 NLCS.

Game 5
Monday, October 18, 2004 at Minute Maid Park in Houston, Texas

The Astros defeated the Cardinals 3–0 in Game 5 with Jeff Kent driving in the winning runs with a walk-off home run in the bottom of the ninth off Jason Isringhausen. Astros starter Brandon Backe took a perfect game into the fifth inning, when he walked Cardinals center fielder Jim Edmonds, and allowed only one hit (a single to second baseman Tony Womack in the sixth) in eight innings. The Cardinals' Woody Williams was nearly as effective, allowing only one hit (a two-out single to Jeff Bagwell in the first) and two walks over seven innings. Kent's home run was the first walkoff postseason home run for an Astro player since Alan Ashby in Game 1 of the 1981 National League Division Series. Houston led the best-of-seven series 3–2 and was one win away from their first World Series appearance.

Game 6
Wednesday, October 20, 2004 at Busch Stadium (II) in St. Louis, Missouri

Returning to St. Louis, Matt Morris started Game 6 for the Cardinals, as did Pete Munro for the Astros. The scoring began with Carlos Beltrán walking with one out, stealing second, moving to third on a single, and scoring on Lance Berkman's sacrifice fly in the first. The Cardinals responded in the bottom of the inning with a two-run home run by Albert Pujols. In the third, Beltrán singled with two outs and scored on Jeff Bagwell's double to tie the game. Again, the Cardinals responded when Édgar Rentería hit a two-run single scoring Albert Pujols and Scott Rolen in the bottom of the inning. Mike Lamb's home run in the fourth cut the Cardinals' lead to 4−3. In the top of the ninth inning Bagwell hit a two-out single off Jason Isringhausen, scoring Morgan Ensberg for the tying run. The game went into extra innings and ended when Jim Edmonds, who hit 42 home runs in the regular season, hit a walk-off two-run home run in the bottom of the 12th off Dan Miceli, sending the series to a Game 7 showdown.

Game 7
Thursday, October 21, 2004 at Busch Stadium (II) in St. Louis, Missouri

The final, deciding Game 7 started off with Astros' leadoff man Craig Biggio smacking a home run in the game's first at-bat off Cardinals' starter Jeff Suppan to make it 1–0. The Astros' threat continued in the second by putting two men on, but, thanks to a tremendous catch by center fielder Jim Edmonds, the Cardinals were able to get out of the inning unscathed. In the third, however, the Astros made it 2–0 with Carlos Beltrán, who walked and stole second, scoring on Jeff Bagwell's sacrifice fly aided by Edmonds's error. The Cardinals cut it to 2−1 in the bottom of the inning when Tony Womack hit a leadoff double, moved to third on a groundout, and scored on Jeff Suppan's bunt groundout. Then in the sixth Albert Pujols doubled to score Roger Cedeno from third to tie the game and Scott Rolen put the Redbirds ahead with a two-run home run off Roger Clemens. St. Louis added another run in the eighth off Roy Oswalt when pinch hitter Marlon Anderson hit a leadoff double, moved to third on a sacrifice bunt, and scored on Larry Walker's single. Jason Isringhausen shut down Houston in the ninth to win the Cardinals their first National League pennant in 17 years.

Composite box
2004 NLCS (4–3): St. Louis Cardinals over Houston Astros

Notes

External links
2004 NLCS at Baseball-Reference

National League Championship Series
National League Championship Series
St. Louis Cardinals postseason
Houston Astros postseason
National League Championship Series
National League Championship Series
2004 in Houston
2000s in St. Louis
National League Championship Series